Oscar Andreas Ingebrigtsen (5 September 1902 – 28 May 1979) was a Norwegian politician for the Labour Party.

He was born in Aalesund, and spent his career as a rotary printer press in the newspapers Aalesunds Avis from 1918 to 1941 and Sunnmøre Arbeideravis from 1945 to 1972. He was a trade unionist, and a board member and chair in several local companies, including the cinematographer.

He was a member of Ålesund city council from 1945 to 1963, serving as mayor from 1955 to 1957. He served as a deputy representative to the Parliament of Norway for the constituency Market towns of Møre og Romsdal county during the terms 1958–1961, 1961–1965 and 1965–1969. He was a full representative from January to September 1958, as he covered for Ulrik Olsen who was a member of government. Ingebrigtsen was a member of the Standing Committee on Public Administration.

References

1902 births
1979 deaths
Mayors of places in Møre og Romsdal
Members of the Storting
Labour Party (Norway) politicians
Politicians from Ålesund
Norwegian trade unionists